Angels & Vampires – Volume II is part of Sananda Maitreya's sixth album. The first six songs were released on October 8, 2005. The fully finished and mastered album was released on April 29, 2006, on his own official site.

For Maitreya, it was a step into new directions. It introduced a more organic, stripped-down sound, quite different from his earlier albums that had heavily taken advantage of electronic equipment.

The album was released with volume I as a limited double CD release in 2007. The double set was only available on his official website and during concerts.

Track listing
"Pretty Baby" – 2:53
"South Side Run" – 2:49
"It's Just My Pain" – 2:19
"Anesthesia" – 3:05
"Floodwater" – 1:30
"When Night Was Calling" – 3:21
"Screamer" – 3:07
"Honestly – 1:49
"Irene" – 2:25
"Marlene" – 3:05
"The Ballad of Lonesome Rhodes" – 2:58
"C.Y.A.M.G." – 2:24
"Duchess" – 3:56
"Madame Swan" – 3:30
"Sometimes You Gotta Cry – 2:48
"OK" – 4:25
"If I Were" – 2:37
"Spoil You Rotten" – 3:45
"The Owl and the Pussycat" – 4:02
"O Jacaranda" – 2:27

External links
Sananda Maitreya's official website includes a more detailed discography

2006 albums
Terence Trent D'Arby albums